The Battle of Khankala was a failed attempt by the Chechen separatists to counterattack at the strategic position at Khankala from Grozny and Argun using armoured vehicles. 

Khankala is a former Soviet military base and airstrip at the eastern outskirts of Grozny, also overtaking the main Rostov-Baku highway and cutting direct access into the Chechen capital of Grozny from the town of Argun. It was captured by a column of Russian troops led by elements of the 104th Guards Airborne Division in a surprise south-east dash from the village of Tolstoy-Yurt.  

Reportedly, in the aftermath of the battle, the Chechen attackers were repelled by Russian paratroopers, losing six tanks and an armoured personnel carrier.

Khankala
Conflicts in 1994
1994 in Russia
Khankala
History of Grozny
December 1994 events in Europe